Mayor FAP Guillermo Protset del Castillo Airport , also known as Vitor Airport and with an additional ICAO code of SPVT, is an airport serving the Vitor District in the Arequipa Region of Peru. The joint military and public airport is just west of the agricultural town of La Joya.

See also

Transport in Peru
List of airports in Peru

References

External links
OurAirports - Vitor Airport

Airports in Peru
Buildings and structures in Arequipa Region